Erin McDougald is a jazz vocalist. Her album Outside the Soirée featured Tom Harrell on trumpet and flugelhorn, and Dave Liebman on soprano and tenor saxophones. McDougald wrote the arrangements for the album.

Discography
 Meeting Place (self-release, 2005)
 Outside the Soiree (Miles High, 2017)

References

External links
 Official site
 Article at the Chicago Tribune
 "Young Singer Shares Love of Jazz", Article at Chicago Sun Times

External links
 YouTube channel

1977 births
Living people
American women jazz singers
American jazz singers
Swing singers
Torch singers
20th-century American singers
20th-century American women singers
21st-century American singers
21st-century American women singers